"Bad Boys" is a song by Swedish singer Zara Larsson from her debut studio album, 1. It was released on 23 October 2013, and was written by Marcus "Mack" Sepehrmanesh, and produced by Elof Loelv. Since its release, it has peaked at number 27 in Sweden, and at number 33 in Denmark, where it was certified Gold in the latter for Streaming.

Music video
A music video directed by Måns Nyman was released on 29 October 2013.

Track listing

Charts

Weekly charts

Certifications

Release history

References

2013 songs
2013 singles
Zara Larsson songs
Songs written by Marcus Sepehrmanesh
Song recordings produced by Elof Loelv